Sándor Nagy may refer to:

 Sándor Nagy (figure skater), Hungarian figure skater
 Sándor Nagy (footballer) (born 1988), Hungarian footballer
 Sándor Nagy (politician) (1946–2015), Hungarian politician
 Sándor Nagy (swimmer) (born 1960), Hungarian swimmer
 Sándor Juhász Nagy (1883–1946), Hungarian politician